GENCO may refer to:

GenCo (acronym for The Generating  Company), an international touring circus company.
Genco Abbandando, the consigliere and business partner of Vito Corleone of The Godfather franchise, for which the olive oil import business, Genco, is named.
Genco, Inc., Japanese anime company.
Genco, a Chicago-based manufacturer of pinball and electro-mechanical games from 1931 through 1958.
Generation company, known as GENCO in Pakistan.